Sinisgalli is an Italian surname. Notable people with this surname include:

 Leonardo Sinisgalli (1908–1981), Italian poet and art critic 
 Rocco Sinisgalli (born 1947), Italian art historian, writer and architectural theoretician

Italian-language surnames

it:Sinisgalli (disambigua)